Bensted is a surname. Notable people with the surname include:

Eric Bensted (1901–1980), Australian cricketer
Jake Bensted (born 1994), Australian judoka
 (born 1986), Australian judoka